Fu Tianlin (born 1946) is a Chinese poet. She was born in the Chinese province of Sichuan, where she still resides. In 1961, after graduating, she worked at an orchard in the countryside, while also working on her poems. In all she wrote ten poems and prose collections.

References

Further reading

1946 births
Living people
Chinese women poets
People's Republic of China poets
Poets from Sichuan
20th-century Chinese women writers
20th-century Chinese poets
21st-century Chinese women writers
21st-century Chinese poets